"Blackmail the Universe" is a 2004 song by American thrash metal band Megadeth, written by frontman Dave Mustaine. It was released as a promotional single from their 2004 album The System Has Failed.

Background 
"Blackmail the Universe" is one of the most political songs Megadeth has, and is filled with attitude. The song starts with a news report of Air Force One being shot down. It features lyrics about nuclear war, terrorism and tensions in the Middle East. The song marks a return to the thrash metal that the band played in their early days. It has been described as similar to the song and album Rust in Peace, not only lyrically, but musically too.

"Blackmail the Universe" has been played 133 times live by the band. The concert tour for The System Has Failed was titled after this song.

Music video 
A music video for "Blackmail the Universe" was recorded on October 9, 2005, and was featured on That One Night: Live in Buenos Aires (although it was also released separately). The video was directed by Michael J. Sarna.

Reception 
"Blackmail Universe" has been noted as a highlight of the album by many reviewers. It has been described as one of, if not "...the (band's) best since Countdown to Extinction". BraveWords praised Chris Poland's guitar work on the song. The song is the most streamed from the album on Spotify.

Other appearances 
"Blackmail the Universe" has appeared on many Megadeth releases, including the greatest hits album Warheads on Foreheads and the aforementioned That One Night live album.

Track listing

Personnel 
Production and performance credits are adapted from the album liner notes, except where noted.
Megadeth
 Dave Mustaine – rhythm and lead guitars, lead vocals

Session musicians
 Chris Poland – lead guitar
 Jimmie Lee Sloas – bass
 Vinnie Colaiuta – drums
 Chris Rodriguez – backing vocals
 Celeste Amber Montague – voice of Reporter
 Darien Bennett – voice of General
 Ralph Patlan – voice of Politician
 Tim Akers – keyboards
 Michael Davis – sound effects
 Eric Darken – percussion

Production
 Produced and recorded by Jeff Balding and Dave Mustaine
 Mixed by Jeff Balding
 Assisted by David Bryant, Ralph Patlan, Scott Kidd, Jesse Amend, Lance Dean, and Jed Hackett
 Additional recording by David Bryant, Jed Hackett, and John Saylor
 Mastered by Adam Ayan
 Digital editing by Mark Hagen and Jed Hackett
 Production coordination by Mike "Frog" Griffith
 Artwork by Larry West

References 

Megadeth songs
2004 songs
2004 singles
Songs written by Dave Mustaine
Songs about nuclear war and weapons